The Firemen's Hall in Cannon Falls, Minnesota, at 206 W. Mill St., was built in 1888.  It was listed on the National Register of Historic Places in 1980.

It was built after fires in 1884 and 1887 devastated the town's business district. It is an 1888 fire station reflecting the peril from and response to fires in the period's communities.

In 2012, it was the Cannon Falls Area Historical Society's museum.

It is a two-story  limestone building with some elements of Italianate style.

It was the Cannon Falls Library from 1953 to 1976.

References

Defunct fire stations in Minnesota
Fire stations on the National Register of Historic Places in Minnesota
Museums in Goodhue County, Minnesota
National Register of Historic Places in Goodhue County, Minnesota
Italianate architecture in Minnesota
Buildings and structures completed in 1888